Time Runner (also known as In Exile) is a 1993 science fiction film directed by Michael Mazo and starring Mark Hamill and Rae Dawn Chong.

Plot

An alien force attacks Earth on October 6, 2022. Aboard a military space station, Captain Michael Raynor, faces the loss of his wife, and escapes before the aliens destroy it. A wormhole appears and sends him thirty years into the past, where he crash-lands on Earth. He goes into hiding, and tries to get a bearing on where he is.

Meanwhile, two scientists discover Raynor's escape pod, and analyze its origins before operatives from the Intelligence and Security Command (ISC) take custody of the unit. The scientists analyze some of the unit's components and discover that it is from the future, having found that a certain Indiana electronics company named in the parts doesn't exist. Upon discovering what time period he is in, Raynor tries to escape the ISC agents, making contact with the scientists and explains his origins. They recover a flight recorder and destroy the escape pod. Having seen the data in the flight recorder, they decide to find Sen. John Neila, who is in the midst of a re-election campaign, explain to him about the invasion. However, Raynor discovers that Neila and the ISC agents are the aliens themselves, having been planted years before as sleeper operatives; one of the scientists, Karen Donaldson, is also revealed to be an alien, turning over the flight recorder to them. Raynor sees visions of his pregnant mother being killed by an assassin. Knowing that he was about to be born in a few hours' time, Raynor scrambles to save his mother while Neila tasks Donaldson to ensure it never happens.

Flash forward to the future and it is revealed that the aliens gain the advantage and attack a secret base in Capitol Hill, where the humans try to launch a nuclear strike while making their last stand. Neila, who is now the Earth's President, asks the launch crew to allow him to negotiate with the aliens, but lulls one man into giving up his revolver, allowing Neila to kill the launch crew and ensure victory for the aliens.

Flashing back to 1992, Raynor kills the assassin and convinces his mother to go with him - just as she goes into labor. The baby is delivered en route, but his mother dies, and Donaldson brings the baby to Neila. Having a change of heart upon cradling the baby, Karen protects the child from Neila. In a last-ditch effort, Raynor pushes Neila off a tall construction plant to his death while Arnie kills Freeman, the lead ISC agent. With Neila dead in 1992, the future Neila disappears from existence as well, but the adult Raynor also screams in pain before dissipating as well, leaving Karen and Arnie with the baby Raynor.

Cast
 Mark Hamill as Captain Michael Raynor
 Rae Dawn Chong as Karen Donaldson
 Brion James as US Senator John Neila
 Mark Baur as Freeman 
 Gordon Tipple as Arnie

Critical reception
The film received mostly negative reviews.

EW.com graded it a C− for having "plenty of gunfire and what-are-we-gonna-do-now? dialogue", and noted that while six screenwriters were credited, more were needed. Leonard Maltin called the film "silly, poorly plotted, badly presented."

References

External links 
 
 Review at Badmovies.org
 
 Worst of Netflix Review
 Mark Hamill is world's crappiest time traveler (review)
 Canuxploitation Review

1990s Canadian films
1990s English-language films
Canadian science fiction action films
Canadian science fiction adventure films
1990s science fiction films
1993 films
Films about time travel
Films set in 1992
Films set in 2022
Films shot in Vancouver